Vice Versa: A Lesson to Fathers is a comic novel by Thomas Anstey Guthrie, writing under the pseudonym "F. Anstey", first published in 1882. The title originates from the Latin phrase "vice versa", meaning "the other way around".

Set in Victorian London, via a magic stone from India a father and son switch places, thus live each other's lives, and gain a better understanding for each other before they switch back.

Plot summary
Set in contemporary Victorian times, the novel concerns businessman Paul Bultitude and his son Dick. Dick is about to leave home to return to a boarding school run by the cane-wielding headmaster, Dr. Grimstone. Bultitude, seeing his son's fear of returning to school, asserts that schooldays are the best years of a boy's life, and how he wishes he were the one going.

At this point, thanks to a magic stone brought by an uncle from India which grants the possessor one wish, the father becomes a boy identical to the son. They are now on even terms. Dick, holding the stone, is ordered by his father to return him to his own body, but Dick refuses, and decides instead to become a man identical to how his father looked before the change. Mr Bultitude has to begin the new term at his son's boarding school, while Dick gets a chance to run his father's business in the City. In the end, both are restored to their own bodies, with a better understanding of each other.

Adaptations

Theatre
In 1883, playwright Edward Rose adapted the story as a West End play, also titled Vice Versa.

Radio
The BBC made a six-part radio series in 1947, adapted and produced by Felix Felton. Paul Bultitude was played by Ronald Simpson, and his mischievous son Dick by John Clark. Dr. Grimstone was played by veteran radio actor Ralph Truman. An early example of creative sound effects before the days of tape meant that when the father succeeds in his wish to be just like his son going off to school, juvenile actor John Clark had to talk to himself. He had to pre-record the father's dialogue on the 15 inch disks used at that time, and leave gaps for the son's character to speak. After much careful rehearsal, the broadcast went out live, with naturalistic speech overlaps.

Film and television
The story has also been adapted for film at least four times, and for television at least once. The first film adaptation was a British silent film released in 1916: it was directed by Maurice Elvey, and starred Charles Rock, Douglas Munro and Guy Newall. The second, also British, was released in 1937. 

The third film, again British, was released in 1948. It was written and directed by Peter Ustinov, and starred Roger Livesey as Paul Bultitude and Anthony Newley (fresh from the Italia Conti Academy) as Dick. John Clark, who had played Dick in the radio adaptation, was initially auditioned and cast by Ustinov, with a seven-year Rank contract. However, his agent had overlooked a clause in his Just William theatre contract, which gave an option for the tour to be repeated across England for another year. Newley was therefore cast in his place.

The 1981 ITV television adaptation featured Peter Bowles as Paul Bultitude.

The 1988 American film version, adapted into a modern setting, stars Judge Reinhold and Fred Savage as the father and son. It did not credit F. Anstey's novel as its source in its initial release, but retained the title.

Allusions/references from other works
The novels Freaky Friday and Summer Switch by Mary Rodgers are modern re-tellings of the same story.

Mr. Bultitude (but not the name of the novel) is mentioned in The Gold Bat by P. G. Wodehouse, in the first paragraph of Chapter XII. The book had previously been referred to as one of those vandalised in Chapter VII.

Mr. Bultitude is also the name of the tame bear (the last of the Seven Bears of Logres) in the third book of C. S. Lewis' science fiction trilogy, That Hideous Strength.

Vice Versa is also mentioned in Episode 15, "Circe", of James Joyce's Ulysses (1922); in Chapter 6 of Malcolm Lowry's Under the Volcano (1947); in Evelyn Waugh's Officers and Gentlemen (1955) (the second in his Sword of Honour trilogy) as the novel Guy was reading in the summer-garden; in Surprised by Joy by C. S. Lewis (1955); in Chapter V of A Prisoner in Fairyland by Algernon Blackwood (1913); in Chapter 3, section 3 of Evil Under the Sun by Agatha Christie (1941); and in In Search of Treasure by Horatio Alger (1907).

See also
 Body swap appearances in media

Footnotes

References

External links
 Read the text at gutenberg.org

Film versions
 
 
 
 
 

1882 British novels
Vice Versa
English fantasy novels
Novels set in boarding schools
D. Appleton & Company books
British novels adapted into films
Works published under a pseudonym
British novels adapted into television shows
British novels adapted into plays
Novels by Thomas Anstey Guthrie